Chalanchulan Rural District is a rural district (dehestan) in Silakhor District, Dorud County, Lorestan Province, Iran. At the 2006 census, its population was 8,288, in 2,055 families.  The rural district has 25 villages.

References 

Rural Districts of Lorestan Province
Dorud County